Alexandrine of Prussia (Friederike Wilhelmine Alexandrine Marie Helene; 23 February 1803 – 21 April 1892) was Grand Duchess of Mecklenburg-Schwerin by marriage to Grand Duke Paul Frederick. She was the daughter of Frederick William III of Prussia and Louise of Mecklenburg-Strelitz.

Life
Born on 23 February 1803 in Prussia, Alexandrine was the seventh child and fourth daughter of King Frederick William III of Prussia and Duchess Louise of Mecklenburg-Strelitz.

Grand Duchess consort of Mecklenburg-Schwerin 
On 25 May 1822, after rejecting a marriage proposal from the future King of Sweden, she married Paul Frederick of Mecklenburg-Schwerin. In 1837, Paul Frederick succeeded his grandfather as Grand Duke of Mecklenburg-Schwerin, making Alexandrine the Grand Duchess of Mecklenburg-Schwerin.

The marriage was generally considered unhappy; Paul Frederick was a military man who had little time for or interest in his wife and family. Alexandrine, by contrast, was a devoted mother who tenderly raised her children and actively cultivated their cultural pursuits. Alexandrine herself was very cultured but was also described as a stereotypically-remote German princess. She was not considered an intellectual but attended scholarly lectures and read many books.

Death 
On 21 April 1892 in Schwerin, Alexandrine died at the age of 89. She was buried at the Cathedral of Schwerin.

At the time of her death, she was the last surviving grandchild of King Frederick William II of Prussia. She outlived all three of her children and would die in the reign of her grandson, Grand Duke Frederick Francis III.

Issue
 Frederick Francis II, Grand Duke of Mecklenburg-Schwerin (1823–1883)
 Luise (1824–1859) married Hugo, Hereditary Prince of Windisch-Graetz and had issue (Princess Marie of Windisch-Graetz)
 Wilhelm (1827–1879) married Princess Alexandrine of Prussia, daughter of Prince Albert of Prussia

Ancestry

References

1803 births
1892 deaths
House of Hohenzollern
Burials at Schwerin Cathedral
People from Berlin
House of Mecklenburg-Schwerin
Prussian princesses
German duchesses
Hereditary Grand Duchesses of Mecklenburg-Schwerin
Duchesses of Mecklenburg-Schwerin
Grand Duchesses of Mecklenburg-Schwerin
Daughters of kings